Gordonia alkaliphila  is a Gram-positive, aerobic and non-motile bacterium from the genus of Gordonia which has been isolated from tidal flat sediments from the Yellow Sea in Korea.

References

External links
Type strain of Gordonia alkaliphila at BacDive -  the Bacterial Diversity Metadatabase

Mycobacteriales
Bacteria described in 2013